Sam or Samuel Angus may refer to:
 Samuel F. Angus (1855–1908), American businessman and sports team owner
 Samuel Angus (1881–1943), Australian theologian
 Samuel Angus, lieutenant at Battle of Frenchman's Creek 1812
 Sam Angus (writer) (born 1967), children's author